The Other Fellow is a 2022 British documentary drama that explores the theme of male identity through the lives, personalities, and adventures of a diverse group of men who share the same name: James Bond. The film combines interviews with live action footage and re-enactment sequences of its subjects. The film was written, produced, and directed by Australian director Matthew Bauer.

Synopsis 
The Other Fellow begins in 1952 at the Goldeneye estate in Jamaica, when British author Ian Fleming creates the character of 007 for his first novel Casino Royale and gives him the name of James Bond, which he takes from a Philadelphia ornithologist of the same name.

Seventy years later in 2022, the film follows several main characters who share the name James Bond. The characters include Gunnar James Bond Schäfer, a superfan of all things 007 with his own James Bond Museum in Sweden; James Alexander Bond, a gay theater director in New York City who finds the name a hindrance; James Bond Jr., an African-American man in Indiana State Prison awaiting trial for murder; and ornithologist James Bond and his wife Mary in Philadelphia, who confront Ian Fleming about the impact his use of their name has had on their lives. The film also includes an additional main character: an unnamed woman living in an unspecified location in England.

The film explores themes of identity, fandom, and the impact of the worldwide digital and cultural footprint of the James Bond franchise on the lives of people who share the name James Bond.

The title comes from the James Bond film  "On Her Majesty's Secret Service". In the film, George Lazenby replaced Sean Connery as the actor portraying James Bond, who at the time was the only actor to have played the role and was a very well-known figure. The first scene of the film features James Bond saving a woman, but instead of kissing him, she chooses to drive away. He then says "This never happened to the other fellow," referencing Sean Connery's portrayal of James Bond. Bauer told Filmink: "These are the situations that our characters face – continuously being in the shadow of this movie icon. For me, it's 007 who is 'the other fellow' – the fictional character."

Cast 
 Gunnar James Bond Schäfer Self - 007 Museum Curator (as Gunnar Schäfer)
 James Alexander Bond as Self-Theatre Director
 James Bond Jr. as Self-Inmate #280938
 Gregory Itzin as James Bond - Ornithologist
 Charley Palmer Rothwell as Johannes Schäfer
 Tacey Adams as Mary Wickham Bond
 Matthew Bauer as Self - Director (voice)
 James Bond as Self - Ornithologist (archive footage)
 Chae-Jamal McFarlane as James Bond
 James Bond as Self

Production 
The film's director, Matthew Bauer, decided to make the movie after contacting hundreds of men named James Bond on social media and discovering that many had unexpected and dramatic stories to share. He interviewed around a hundred James Bonds, and narrowed it down to fifteen characters that were featured in the film, five of whom were the main characters.

Bauer told Variety magazine: "What interested me was not so much that these men are named James Bond, but how the name connects them to a global media phenomenon – literally, emotionally, and especially digitally. The real plot of The Other Fellow centers around the surprising ways its force pushes and pulls their lives in the most unexpected directions. And how it connects them together in ways you'd never anticipate."

Filming 
Filming took place between the premiere of the James Bond film Skyfall until the premiere of  No Time to Die. The film was shot in various countries including the United Kingdom, USA, Jamaica, Sweden, Italy, Canada, India, Thailand and Guyana.

Release and Reception

Release 
The Other Fellow premiered at the 2022 Doc Edge Film Festival as its Opening Night Film. It was subsequently screened at a number of other film festivals, including the Melbourne Documentary Film Festival, the Dinard Festival of British Cinema, the Austin Film Festival where it was nominated for Best Documentary, and the San Francisco Independent Film Festival. It was picked up by distributor Gravitas Ventures for a February 17, 2023 North American release.

Reception 
The film has received positive reviews on the review aggregation website Rotten Tomatoes. In a four star review The AU Review reviewer Peter Gray described the film as "Funny and poignant, [Matthew] Bauer's lens feels welcomingly progressive and, most importantly, laced in a relatability and humanity that isn't always afforded by the character's incarnation."

Stuff reviewer James Croot described the film as "A fascinating look at the trials, tribulations and potential opportunities of unexpected and unwanted fame in the age of social media."

Accolades

References

External links 
 Official website
 

James Bond in film
2022 films
British documentary films
2022 documentary films
2020s English-language films